Cruel Inventions is the sixth studio album by American singer and songwriter Sam Phillips.

Critical reception

Cruel Inventions received mostly favorable reviews from critics. At Entertainment Weekly, David Browne gave the album an A, writing that it "...is fraught with both beauty and tension, making it one of the year's most beguiling records." Browne named it his sixth favorite album of 1991.

Track listing

Personnel 

 Sam Phillips – vocals, Chamberlin, guitars 
 T Bone Burnett – Chamberlin, guitars
 Van Dyke Parks – Chamberlin, string arrangements 
 Jim Goodwin – acoustic piano
 Elvis Costello – guitars
 Marc Ribot – guitars
 Jerry Scheff – bass
 Alex Acuña – drums, percussion
 Michael Blair – drums, percussion
 Mickey Curry – drums, percussion
 Ralph Forbes – drums, percussion
 David Kemper – drums, percussion
 Scott Musick – drums, percussion
 Sandy Bull – oud
 The Sid Page Strings – string quartet
 Larry Corbett – cello
 John Acevedo – viola
 Sid Page – violin
 Joel Derouin – violin

Production 

 T Bone Burnett – producer
 Stacy Baird – recording 
 Rik Pekkonen – recording 
 Joe Schiff – recording 
 Tchad Blake – mixing
 Kevin Killen – mixing
 Max Garcia – assistant engineer
 Mark Guilbeault – assistant engineer
 Julie Last – assistant engineer
 Tom Nellen – assistant engineer
 Chris Niswander – assistant engineer
 Eric Rudd – assistant engineer
 Brian Soucy – assistant engineer
 Jeff Ward – assistant engineer
 Bob Ludwig – mastering at Masterdisk (New York City, New York)
 Melanie Nissen – art direction 
 Inge Schapp – design 
 Kathleen Philpott – design 
 Anton Corbijn – photography 
 Borman Entertainment – management

References

1991 albums
Sam Phillips (musician) albums
Albums produced by T Bone Burnett
Virgin Records albums